Radical Republicans were a United States political movement.

Radical Republican may also refer to:

Radical Party (France), formerly the Republican, Radical and Radical-Socialist Party
Radicalism (historical), European left-wing movement
Radical Republican Party, Spanish political party

See also 
Republican Party (disambiguation)
Political radicalism
Republicanism